Mera Pakistani Safarnama is a travelogue written in Punjabi by Indian actor Balraj Sahni. The book describes his 1960 journey through Pakistan.

References 

1960 Indian novels
Indian travel books
Punjabi-language books
20th-century Indian books